Sarangesa aza is a species of butterfly in the family Hesperiidae. It is found in southern Sudan and north-western Tanzania.

References

Butterflies described in 1951
Celaenorrhinini